Susaninsky District is an administrative and municipal district (raion), one of the twenty-four in Kostroma Oblast, Russia. It is located in the west of the oblast. Its administrative center is the urban locality (an urban-type settlement) of Susanino. Population:  9,184 (2002 Census);  The population of Susanino accounts for 52.6% of the district's total population.

References

Notes

Sources

Districts of Kostroma Oblast